Terny is a village in Kramatorsk Raion (district) in Donetsk Oblast of eastern Ukraine, at about  east-northeast of the centre of Donetsk city. It belongs to Lyman rural hromada, one of the hromadas of Ukraine.

The settlement came under attack by Russian forces during the Russian invasion of Ukraine in 2022, and was regained by Ukrainian forces by the end of September the same year.

References

Villages in Kramatorsk Raion